Michael Benoît Mokongo (born July 11, 1986) is a professional basketball player who last played for AS Monaco Basket of the LNB Pro B in France.

International career 
Mokongo first represented the Central African Republic internationally at the 2009 AfroBasket qualifying tournament. He played for the country at the 2011 AfroBasket, averaging 11 points and a team-high 6 assists. Mokongo has also competed for France in the past, playing for them in the 2006 FIBA Europe Under-20 Championship. He was initially expected to play for the Central African Republic at the AfroBasket 2015 under head coach Aubin-Thierry Goporo, but a knee injury forced him to not compete at the event.

References

External links 
Michael Mokongo at Euroleague.net
Michael Mokongo at Eurobasket.com
Michael Mokongo at fiba.com

1986 births
Living people
APOEL B.C. players
Bandırma B.İ.K. players
BCM Gravelines players
CB Breogán players
Central African Republic men's basketball players
Central African Republic expatriate sportspeople in Spain
Cholet Basket players
Chorale Roanne Basket players
Élan Chalon players
French sportspeople of Central African Republic descent
Shooting guards
Orlandina Basket players
People from Ombella-M'Poko
Point guards
Club Ourense Baloncesto players
Basket Navarra Club players